Leonid Martynov (Леонид Николаевич Мартынов) (1905 in Omsk – 1980) was a Soviet poet.

Career
Between 1939 and 1945 he published three books of poetry, but only became better known after the death of Stalin. From 1955 his poems began to be published widely in magazines and in book form.

His style is of the old school of the 1920s, with many local references to Siberia.

Musical settings
Aleksandr Lokshin set five poems by Martynov in his Ninth Symphony.

References

1905 births
1980 deaths
Soviet poets
Soviet male writers